San Pedro de Tiquina Municipality is the second municipal section of the Manco Kapac Province in the La Paz Department in Bolivia. Its seat is San Pedro de Tiquina.

Subdivision 
The municipality is divided into five cantons.

The people 
The people are predominantly indigenous citizens of Aymaran descent. 

Ref.: obd.descentralizacion.gov.bo

Languages 
The languages spoken in the San Pedro de Tiquina Municipality are mainly Aymara and Spanish.

See also 
 Strait of Tiquina

References 

 obd.descentralizacion.gov.bo

External links 
 Population data and map of San Pedro de Tiquina Municipality

Municipalities of La Paz Department (Bolivia)